Tom Schreiber (born February 24, 1992), is an American professional lacrosse player with the Archers LC of the Premier Lacrosse League and the Toronto Rock of the National Lacrosse League. He attended St. Anthony's High School in South Huntington, New York, and played collegiate lacrosse at Princeton University.

College career 
Schreiber is the all-time leading scorer from the midfield position at Princeton with 200 points and was a four-time USILA All-American including three seasons on the First Team. He won the MacLaughlin Award as the nation's most outstanding midfielder his junior and senior seasons.

Professional career

MLL career 
Schreiber was selected 1st overall in the 2014 Major League Lacrosse draft by the Ohio Machine. He was named league MVP in both the 2016 and 2017 seasons while leading the Ohio Machine to the MLL championship game in both seasons and winning the championship in 2017.

NLL career 
Schreiber signed as an unrestricted free agent with the Toronto Rock on October 3, 2016 and scored 94 points during his first season in the National Lacrosse League on his way to being named NLL Rookie of the Year. In 2019 he matched his career high with another 94 point season.

Heading into the 2023 NLL season, Inside Lacrosse ranked Schreiber the #7 best forward in the NLL.

PLL career 
In October 2018 it was announced that Schreiber was one of over 140 players who had signed contracts to play in the newly formed Premier Lacrosse League. Following this announcement, Schreiber was assigned to the Archers Lacrosse Club.

Personal life 
Schreiber is married to fellow Princeton alum and Olympic field hockey player Kathleen Sharkey. They have a daughter, Lillian.

Awards and achievements

College 

 2011 USILA Third Team All-American
 2012 USILA First Team All-American
 2013 USILA First Team All-American
 2013 Lt. Donald MacLaughlin Jr. Award
 2014 USILA First Team All-American
 2014 Lt. Donald MacLaughlin Jr. Award

MLL 

 2016 MLL Most Valuable Player
 2017 MLL Most Valuable Player

NLL 

 2017 NLL Rookie of the Year

PLL 

 2019 Gait Brothers Midfielder of the Year
 2020 Gait Brothers Midfielder of the Year

Statistics

PLL
Reference:

NLL
Reference:

MLL

NCAA

References

External links
 Princeton Tigers bio

American lacrosse players
1992 births
Living people
Premier Lacrosse League players
Ohio Machine players
Toronto Rock players
Princeton Tigers men's lacrosse players
People from East Meadow, New York
20th-century American people
21st-century American people
American expatriate sportspeople in Canada
Lacrosse players from New York (state)
Competitors at the 2022 World Games
World Games silver medalists